Mariano Suárez Veintimilla (8 June 1897 – 23 October 1980) was an Ecuadorian politician.

He was Minister of Finance from 1944 to 1945. He served as Velasco's Vice President from 1946 until he was ousted in 1947 by Carlos Mancheno Cajas. Soon Mancheno was ousted and Suárez served briefly as President of Ecuador from 2 September 1947 to 16 September 1947.

References

1897 births
1980 deaths
People from Otavalo (city)
Ecuadorian people of Spanish descent
Conservative Party (Ecuador) politicians
Presidents of Ecuador
Vice presidents of Ecuador
Ecuadorian Ministers of Finance